Physeterula was a prehistoric close relative of the sperm whale from the Miocene. Its fossils have been found in Europe and the United States.

This large species is the most stemward physeterid, retaining functional upper teeth lacking enamel.

References

Prehistoric toothed whales
Miocene cetaceans
Sperm whales
Prehistoric cetacean genera
Fossil taxa described in 1877
Extinct mammals of Europe